Hsu Ching-wen (born 19 August 1996) is a Taiwanese former professional tennis player.

Hsu won five singles and 12 doubles titles on the ITF Circuit. On 21 March 2016, she reached her best singles ranking of world No. 317. On 9 January 2017, she peaked at No. 163 in the WTA doubles rankings. In November 2019, she played her last professional tournament at the Taipei Challenger.

Hsu was born in Kaohsiung. Playing for Chinese Taipei Fed Cup team, she has a win–loss record of 3–5.

ITF Circuit finals

Singles: 9 (5 titles, 4 runner–ups)

Doubles: 24 (12 titles, 12 runner–ups)

References

External links

 
 
 

1996 births
Living people
Sportspeople from Kaohsiung
Taiwanese female tennis players
21st-century Taiwanese women